What's Up Downunder is an Australian travel television show that airs on Network Ten and One. It debuted in 2010 for two seasons on Seven Network and 7two before swapping networks in 2012. The series has also spawned print and digital magazines along with a vast range of websites promoting and highlighting the caravan and camping lifestyle.

Cast
The cast in 2017 includes Craig "Macca" McGown, Angie Hilton, Tania Kernaghan and Robby Nethercote.

References

Seven Network original programming
Network 10 original programming
Australian travel television series
2010 Australian television series debuts
English-language television shows